The 90th Indianapolis 500 was held at the Indianapolis Motor Speedway in Speedway, Indiana on Sunday May 28, 2006. Sam Hornish Jr. won from the pole position. It was Hornish's first and only win at Indianapolis, and the record fourteenth Indy victory for Penske Racing. Hornish would later win the IndyCar Series championship, the second driver in a row to sweep the Indy 500 and season championship in the same season.

In one of the most dramatic finishes in Indy history, 19-year old rookie Marco Andretti took the lead with three laps to go, after passing his father Michael Andretti on the outside of turn one. Marco Andretti battled Sam Hornish Jr. over the final two laps, holding off the challenge until the final straightaway. On the final lap, Hornish passed Marco Andretti about 450 feet from the finish line to take the win. It was the first time a driver successfully made a pass for the lead on the final lap for victory in the 90-year history of the event.

The margin of victory was 0.0635 seconds - just over one car-length - which was the second-closest finish in Indy history at the time. (As of 2019, it is the third-closest). Defending race winner and defending IndyCar champion Dan Wheldon dominated much of the race, leading 148 of the 200 laps. However, a small tire puncture forced him to make his final pit stop earlier than planned, which coupled with an untimely caution period, saw him slip to fourth at the finish.

The race was sanctioned by the Indy Racing League and was part of the 2006 IndyCar Series season. Rain and cold temperatures washed out the first weekend of time trials, and washed out or delayed numerous days of practice. Race weekend, however, was sunny with no precipitation.

Background
Chevrolet and Toyota withdrew from the series, leaving Honda as the sole engine provider for all teams for 2006 through 2011. Three races preceded the Indy 500, and Hélio Castroneves, with two wins and one second place, held a large points lead going into the month of May.

A new series initiative introduced the use of ethanol fuel. As part of a two-year roll-out, all entries for 2006 were required to utilize a 10% ethanol/90% methanol fuel blend (E10). Previously, from 1974 to 2005, methanol was the only fuel permitted, and from 1965 to 1973, the rules were crafted in such a fashion as to encourage the use of methanol in order to be competitive.

Team and driver changes
Several drivers shuffles occurred during the offseason. Defending Indy 500 winner and 2005 IndyCar champion Dan Wheldon switched from Andretti Green Racing to Ganassi. Wheldon started off the season with a victory at the season opener at Homestead. However, the race was marred by the death of Paul Dana during the morning practice session.

Marco Andretti moved up from the Indy Lights series and took over the vacated spot at Andretti Green Racing. In December, team owner Michael Andretti announced he would come out of retirement to race at Indy, alongside his son. Similarly, owner/driver Eddie Cheever announced he would get back into the car, participating in four races, including Indy.

Tomas Scheckter moved from Panther to Vision Racing. Vítor Meira took over the vacant spot at Panther, leaving the Rahal team. Paul Dana was signed as the third car for RLR, but was replaced by Jeff Simmons after his tragic fatal crash. Rahal maintained the services of Buddy Rice and Danica Patrick.

After a brief retirement, Al Unser Jr., who missed the 2005 race, signed with Dreyer & Reinbold Racing. Unser would race alongside teammate Buddy Lazier, who signed on for a partial season ride at DRR.

Hemelgarn Racing signed P. J. Chesson with financial backing from NBA basketball player Carmelo Anthony. An aggressive marketing campaign nicknamed the entry "Car Melo," and also acquired the services of Jeff Bucknum for a two-car effort. However, by month's end, a disastrous result saw the two cars crash out together on lap 2, placing 32nd-33rd respectively. Hemelgarn subsequently closed its doors for the remainder of the season.

Race schedule

Practice (week 1)

Rookie Orientation - Sunday May 7
Opening day featured rookie orientation and refresher tests. The day opened with the Andretti family celebrating three generations (Mario, Michael, and Marco) taking a ceremonial lap around the track together.

Michael Andretti, Al Unser Jr., and Arie Luyendyk Jr. participated in refresher tests. Rookies P. J. Chesson and Marco Andretti passed the four-phase rookie test. Townsend Bell took only "shake down" laps. Michael Andretti (220.999 mph) was the fastest car of the day.

Rookie Orientation - Monday May 8
The second day of rookie orientation saw Thiago Medeiros pass the rookie test. Townsend Bell (221.381 mph) was the fastest car of the day.

Tuesday May 9
The first full day of veteran practice. Sam Hornish Jr. (224.811 mph) was the fastest car of the day.

Wednesday May 10
Sam Hornish Jr. (226.056 mph) was the fastest car of the day. The track closed early due to rain at 3:30 p.m.

Thursday May 11
Rain delayed the start of practice until nearly 2 p.m. Marty Roth spun in turn two, but made no contact. Sam Hornish Jr. (226.789 mph) was the fastest car of the day.

"Fast" Friday May 12
Rain washed out practice for the day.

Time trials (first weekend wash out)

Saturday May 13
Time trials was scheduled for four days. The "11/11/11" format was to be utilized, with eleven positions available on pole day. However, rain washed out time trials for the day. Pole day qualifying was rescheduled for Sunday May 14.

Sunday May 14
The "11/11/11" format was scheduled to be used, and thus 22 position were to be open for qualifying on Sunday May 14. Rain continued to fall, but the track dried shortly after 1 p.m. The cars took to the track for practice for about an hour, and Dan Wheldon turned the fastest lap of the month at 228.663 mph. At 2:15 p.m., the rain resumed, and the track was closed for the day. Time trials was washed out for the entire weekend for the first time since 1983.

Practice (week 2)

Wednesday May 17
Sam Hornish Jr. (224.381 mph) was the fastest car of the day. Rain closed the track early at 4:26 p.m.

Thursday May 18
Rain kept the track closed until 3:45 p.m. Arie Luyendyk Jr. and Thiago Medeiros suffered crashes. The brief session was ended at 5:52 p.m., as rain fell again. Sam Hornish Jr. (224.381 mph) was the fastest car of the day.

"Fast" Friday II May 19
Sam Hornish Jr. (227.925 mph) was the fastest car of the day. Hornish led the speed charts on all three practice days during the second week. Marty Roth spun but made no contact. Jeff Simmons crashed in turn one, but was uninjured.

Time trials (second weekend)

Pole Day - Saturday May 20
Since the first two days of time trials were rained out, 33 positions were available for time trials on May 20. The field was filled to 32 cars by the end of the day.

Only one driver waved off during the day. Dario Franchitti experienced engine trouble after three laps, but later completed his attempt after an engine change. Although the new qualifying rules allowed qualified cars to be withdrawn and re-qualified in hopes of gaining a better starting position (with a maximum of three attempts per day), only one driver took the opportunity to do so. This improved his starting position by only one spot.

Bump Day - Sunday May 21
The day opened with one position open in the field, and two drivers prepared to make an attempt. Rookie Thiago Medeiros, who had crashed his lone car on Thursday, returned to the track for practice.

Most of the afternoon focused on race day practice for already-qualified cars. Sam Hornish Jr. (226.256 mph) led the speed charts for practice laps, capping off a month where he led the speed chart every day he took practice laps except one.

Marty Roth was the only driver besides Medeiros that was looking to make an attempt. At 3:30 p.m., polesitter Sam Hornish Jr. spun in turn one and hit the outside wall while practicing in a backup car. He was uninjured.

With about an hour to go, A. J. Foyt brought a backup car to pit lane, driver Ryan Briscoe was getting settled into the car, fueling rumors of a late qualifying run.

At 5:08 p.m., Thiago Medeiros completed a qualifying attempt, and filled the field to 33 cars, however he was slowest and now on the bubble.

With 23 minutes left in the day, Marty Roth spun during a practice run, and crashed into the outside wall in turn 1. He was not injured, but the car was wrecked, and his chances to qualify were finished. The day ended with Medeiros the only car to complete an attempt for the afternoon with Briscoe deciding against making a run.

Carb Day - Friday May 26
Sam Hornish Jr. once again led the speed charts (220.698 mph). It was the ninth day of the month that Hornish completed the fastest practice lap.

Penske Racing with driver Hélio Castroneves won the 30th Annual Checker's/Rally's Indy 500 Pit Stop Challenge.

Qualifying chronology

Starting grid

  - Former Indianapolis 500 Winner
  - Indianapolis 500 Rookie

Failed to qualify
25 - Marty Roth — Wrecked during practice.

Race summary

Start
After considerable rain during the month, race day was sunny and hot.

Due to the state of Indiana observing Daylight Saving Time, the start of the race was scheduled for 1:11 p.m. EDT. Mari Hulman George gave the command to start engines at 1:04 p.m. EDT, and all 33 cars pulled away for the pace laps, with Lance Armstrong driving the pace car.

Sugar Ray Leonard waved the green flag to start the race, and polesitter Sam Hornish Jr. took the lead into turn one. Down the back stretch, Hélio Castroneves passed Hornish for the lead, and Dan Wheldon moved into second. Castroneves led the opening lap.

On the second lap in turn two, Jeff Bucknum spun out and collected his teammate P. J. Chesson, taking both of the entries from Hemelgarn Racing out of the race and sadly out for the remainder of the season.

First half
After the Hemelgarn incident, a long period of green-flag racing ensued, lasting 60 laps.  During this period, Dan Wheldon dominated the race, briefly losing then regaining the lead during a round of green-flag pit stops around laps 36-39. By lap 64, Wheldon had built up a 19-second lead—nearly half a lap—over the next nearest competitor, and after 65 laps had lapped twenty-five of the other cars in the race, including all five of the other former 500 winners, leaving only eight cars on the lead lap.

The field tightened during a yellow flag on lap 67 due to a crash by Tomas Scheckter. The crash sent debris into the inside grandstand, injuring five spectators, none seriously. Wheldon maintained the lead through a series of pit stops, and led at the halfway point.

Second half
Wheldon gave up the lead briefly during pit stop on lap 108, which allowed Scott Dixon to lead.

On lap 110, Hélio Castroneves struck Buddy Rice from behind, taking out both cars.  It was the first time two former winners had been involved in the same crash in the Indy 500 since 1992. It was also the first time in his career that Castroneves failed to finish the race.

Sam Hornish Jr., took the lead from Wheldon on lap 130. Wheldon, however, would regain the lead on lap 145 and hold it through lap 182.

On lap 149, Al Unser Jr. precipitated a caution period after spinning down the back-stretch and crashing in turn 3. During the caution, Jeff Simmons left the pit area with the fuel hose nozzle still attached. The hose tore, and Simmons's car dropped the nozzle out on the track in turn 3. On lap 150, the leaders pitted. Sam Hornish Jr. started to pull out of his pits with the hose still attached. The hose ripped, but Hornish stopped in the pits allowing the crew to disengage the nozzle. Team owner Roger Penske accepted responsibility for the error, having told Hornish to go before the fueling was complete. Fuel spilled in the pit stall, but Hornish was able to return to the track and stay on the lead lap.

Still under caution on lap 155, the field was preparing to go back to green when Jeff Simmons wrecked in the north chute. The caution was prolonged. On lap 160, Michael Andretti and Sam Hornish Jr. ducked into the pits to top off their fuel. Both would be able to make it to the finish without another pit stop.

On lap 163, the green came back out with Dan Wheldon leading. Sam Hornish Jr. was assessed a "drive-through" penalty (being required to drive once through pit road, without stopping, obeying the pit road speed limit). Hornish returned to the track over 30 seconds behind the leader.

Tony Kanaan took the lead on lap 183. By lap 187, members of Andretti Green Racing held the top four spots (Kanaan, Marco Andretti, Dario Franchitti, and Michael Andretti). Sam Hornish Jr. in sixth barely clung to the tail end of the lead lap.

Late Race Caution and Finish
Dan Wheldon (lap 184) and Marco Andretti (lap 190) went to the pits for their final fuel stops. As Marco Andretti was pitting Felipe Giaffone crashed in turn two, bringing out the yellow. Marco Andretti (legally) slipped by the pace car exiting the pits, and avoided losing a lap in the shuffle. Leader Tony Kanaan, who still needed to pit, was stuck out on the track as the pits were closed at the onset of the yellow. The pits re-opened as the field came by for lap 193. Kanaan and Dario Franchitti ducked into the pits for fuel. Fan-favorite Michael Andretti stayed out on the track, and assumed the lead. Michael had come out of retirement to race with his 19-year-old son Marco, who shuffled up to second place. In his 15th Indy 500, Michael was still looking for his first Indy victory. Scott Dixon was lined up third, and Sam Hornish Jr. was now up to fourth.

The green came out with 4 laps to go. Michael Andretti led the field, with his son Marco close behind in second. Hornish made a desperate pass deeper in the field, and emerged in third place as the field exited turn 2.

With three laps to go, Marco Andretti pulled outside of his father down the front-stretch, and passed his father for the lead in turn 1. Marco began to pull away as Michael now assumed a blocking role to protect his son's lead. Down the back stretch, Michael tried but failed to hold off the charging Hornish, and Hornish took over second place.

With two laps to go, Marco led Hornish by a half second, with Michael still in third. Down the back stretch, Hornish tried to squeeze past Marco as they approached turn three. He was pinched down, and ran out of race track, and had to back off. Hornish lost his momentum, and Marco pulled out to a 1-second lead at the start/finish line with one lap to go.

On the final lap, Marco held his lead down the back stretch. In turn three, however, Hornish began to reel him in. As the two cars exited turn four, Hornish executed a slingshot pass in the final 400 feet. It was the second-closest finish in Indy 500 history. It was also the first time in Indy history that a driver made a pass for the lead to win the race on the final lap.

Afterwards, Hornish commented on his last-second pass, "I figured I came all this way, I ought to give myself one more shot at it.  I kind of looked at it as, I was going to drive over him if I had to. For Marco to come as a rookie and drive like that he should be proud no matter what."

Third-place finisher Michael Andretti had high praise for his son: "I felt so bad for Marco, but I'm so proud.  He drove a hell of a race.  I drove with him a hell of a lot in that race.  He drove like a champion.  He drove like he's been out there 10 years."  But Marco wanted more: "I do not want to wait until next year. I have to take advantage of everything because second's nothing," he said.

Box score

*C Chassis: D=Dallara; P=Panoz.  
All cars in the 2006 Indianapolis 500 used Honda engines and Firestone tires.

 = Former Indianapolis 500 winner;  = Indianapolis 500 rookie

Race statistics

Race notes

For the first time, Honda was the sole engine supplier to the field.  It is believed that for the first time in Indianapolis 500 history, that the race was run without a single engine problem during the entire month.
In Hornish's seven tries at the Indy 500, this was the first that he had even completed .
It was the 14th Indianapolis 500 win for Roger Penske as an owner.
This was the first Indianapolis 500 in which the leader of lap 199 did not win the race.
The second- and third-place finishes by Marco and Michael Andretti were the 49th and 50th unsuccessful attempts to win the 500 by members of the Andretti family as drivers (Michael Andretti was a winning owner in 2005 then would be again in 2007, 2014, 2016, and 2017) since patriarch Mario Andretti's sole win in 1969, extending what is popularly called the "Andretti Curse" at the Indianapolis Motor Speedway.
A few weeks after the race, Tom Carnegie announced his retirement after 61 years, making the 2006 500 his final race as track announcer.
ABC Sports utilized Side-By-Side for the first time during the Indianapolis 500.

Broadcasting

Radio
The race was carried live on the Indianapolis Motor Speedway Radio Network. Mike King served as chief announcer.

For the second year in a row, pit reporter Kevin Olson conducted a pre-race interview with David Letterman. This would be the final 500 on the radio for Adam Alexander.

Television
The race was carried live flag-to-flag coverage in the United States on ABC Sports. After a critically unpopular season as chief announcer for the IndyCar series on ABC/ESPN, Todd Harris was removed from the broadcast booth. Veteran announcer Marty Reid took over as play-by-play. Scott Goodyear returned as driver analyst. Joining them in the booth was 1989 NASCAR Winston Cup Champion Rusty Wallace, who served as co-analyst with Goodyear.

For the first time ever, the broadcast utilized the Side-By-Side feature during commercial breaks. This was also the final "500" broadcast solely in standard-definition.

Gallery

Notes

Works cited
2006 Indianapolis 500 Daily Trackside Report for the Media
Indianapolis 500 History: Race & All-Time Stats - Official Site

Indianapolis 500 races
Indianapolis 500
Indianapolis 500
Indianapolis 500